The Predators is a 2020 Italian comedy-drama film written and directed by Pietro Castellitto in his directorial debut.

The film was presented at the Horizons section of the 77th Venice International Film Festival, where it received the Best Screenplay Award.

Plot
One day in Ostia, a charismatic watch seller manages to cheat old Ines Vismara by giving her a lousy watch for 1000 euros. This episode enrages Claudio, Ines' son, a fascist owner of a gun shop and destabilizes Ines to the point that, while crossing a street, she gets run over by a van.

Ines is saved and brought to the hospital by medic Pierpaolo Pavone, householder of an intellectual radical chic family: his wife Laura is an uncompromising film director, and their son Federico is a 25-years-old scholar passionate with Friedrich Nietzsche who gets mad once his professor Nicola tells him that he can't join him in exhuming Nietzsche's body. Pierpaolo is having an affair with Gaia, the young girlfriend of Bruno Parise, a colleague of his who enjoys in making pranks to him.

One day, Federico manages to buy from Claudio a bomb in order to use it to destroy Nietzsche's grave: Federico completes his mission, despite being injured during the explosion. Flavio, Claudio's uncle, tells him that after being arrested, Federico will tell from where he bought the bomb and, thanks to being the son of a medic and a director, he won't be sent to jail, but if the cops will find out Claudio's guns, he will surely get imprisoned. So, Flavio orders Claudio to kill Federico.

Once he reaches Federico, Claudio finds out that he is the son of Pierpaolo, the medic who saved his mother's life, and aborts the mission. Once Flavio asks for explanations, Claudio brings his 12-years-old gun-loving son Cesare at the meeting and the kid shoots and kills Flavio with a shotgun. Claudio gets arrested but doesn't lose his parental authority.

A few months later, Bruno has died for a brain cancer that Pierpaolo diagnosed him and Gaia manages to find a new boyfriend in the very watch seller that triggered the whole story.

Cast

Accolades
77th Venice International Film Festival (2020)
 Horizons Award for Best Screenplay

David di Donatello Awards (2021)
 David di Donatello for Best New Director to Pietro Castellitto
 Nomination for David di Donatello for Best Original Screenplay to Pietro Castellitto
 Nomination for David di Donatello for Best Producer to Domenico Procacci and Laura Paolucci
 Nomination for David di Donatello for Best Score to Niccolò Contessa

References

External links

2020 films
2020 comedy-drama films
2020 directorial debut films
Italian comedy-drama films
2020s Italian-language films
Films set in the 2000s
Films set in Rome
2020s Italian films
Rai Cinema films
Fandango (Italian company) films